Trypoxylon clavatum is a species of square-headed wasp in the family Crabronidae. It is found in North America.

Subspecies
These two subspecies belong to the species Trypoxylon clavatum:
 Trypoxylon clavatum clavatum Say, 1837
 Trypoxylon clavatum johannis Richards, 1934

References

Crabronidae
Articles created by Qbugbot
Insects described in 1837